The Alliance of Young Nurse Leaders and Advocates, also known as AYNLA, is a professional organization in the Philippines advocating for the achievement of the United Nations Millennium Development Goals (now Sustainable Development Goals), Universal Health Care, and advancement of nurses' rights and welfare. It was established in the year 2009 and registered with the Philippine Securities and Exchange Commission in 2010. The headquarters of the organization is currently located at Villaruel Street, in Pasay.

History 
Nine young professional nurses got together to establish AYNLA aiming to advance certain youth and health issues. AYNLA was conceived late August 2009 taking in a different name for its organizational test run. Moreover, it was launched in a different name and calling to serve as a springboard to the AYNLA it is now. The organization was formally conceptualized and was drafted in September 2009.

The Birth of AYNLA
There were a lot of glitches and heated arguments creating the major stirring in the then organization until it reaches reorganization and eventually a lot of gray areas leaving many of its founding members left hanging in mid-air. Tensions arise and many discontented leaders just left the organization in inactivity. The then Board of Trustees was stirred by political issues and many issues left unanswered leading to the disbandment of the Board. The disbandment led a revolutionary turnabout leading to a new organization; the primary calling of AYNLA came in.

Call of Leadership
Before the disbandment of the former Board, the then organization met with the Philippine Nurses Association – the motherboard of all nursing organizations in the Philippines. A question was raised on what is the specific nursing area of concern the organization was bearing. After the meeting, the then officers have decided to take Nursing Leadership & Management as the flagship program concept for the organization – the primary calling of AYNLA. By then all programs and services of the then organization were geared towards leadership.

Rise of AYNLA
After the stormy disbandment of the former Board and after the untimely resignation of all its Board members, the rise of AYNLA comes as fast as the disbandment of the former. Taking into the mandate of nursing leadership, management and now incorporating the concept of advocacy, the new organization took its new name and quickly reorganized itself to serve as a cushion to many of its wandering members of its status. The disbandment of the former Board now created two separate and totally different organizations, the former organization and AYNLA International. The new organization is composed majorly of the leaders of the former organization but was given the options to choose between the two. Similarly, in the local levels, members were asked to choose between having their membership active in the former or the latter; but was discouraged from becoming active members of both since there may be conflicting interests among its leaders.

Starting it Right
After the storm that hit the leaders of the former organization and now taking the banner of AYNLA, the leaders have met and talked about the next steps for the new organization. One of the stronghold leaders of AYNLA created series of consultative meetings with its circle of leaders and trusted members to finalize and concretize the plans to establish a national and international organization of young nurse leaders. A new Board arises and is now called the Alliance Board. Vigilant and assertive, the Alliance Board quickly assembles itself and restructures the organization. AYNLA now starts from the ashes. But just as a glorious phoenix has to die to ashes to give birth to a more lasting and powerful phoenix, such as the former organization has to be left to spring a better and more dynamic organization – that is now the Alliance of Young Nurse Leaders and Advocates International.

AYNLA and the UN Millennium Development Goals Campaign

AYNLA, now taking its global stand on healthcare and leadership, unanimously agreed that the UN Millennium Development Campaign on the 8 Millennium Development Goals needs to be addressed properly mostly in the nursing and healthcare professions. The rising HIV incidence rates, depressing maternal health and increasing child mortality rates alarm the leaders of AYNLA and have seen its grave impact in the nursing profession – where nurses are in the forefront of these main issues. AYNLA believes that all the 8 MDGs are related to nursing and healthcare and, therefore, must take serious actions to address these. A new mandate from the stronghold leaders of AYNLA now includes the participation of the organization in every MDG and aligning all its programs and activities in achieving the MDGs through nursing leadership and advocacy. With this, AYNLA now has a more meaningful existence and a more compelling drive to push the advocacies of the organization and work with the international arena.

AYNLA and the 2010 International Year of the Nurse
Another global calling that AYNLA was called to participate is the celebration of the 2010 International Year of the Nurse (IYN) – an international celebration of the centennial year of the Founder of Modern Nursing, the late Florence Nightingale, and the global nurses serving the world. The IYN is spearheaded by the Nightingale Initiative for Global Health (NIGH) and Sigma Theta Tau International (STTI), the international honorary society of nurses. IYN also advocates and pushes the UN MDGs in the global arena. AYNLA is fortunate to be recognized as a partner organization for the Philippines to hold this activity.

The Road Less Traveled
Currently, AYNLA traverses the painstaking road as it expands its borders in the national and international nursing arena and encouraging more new generation nurses to be active in the profession, its causes and to further develop more nurse leaders today.

The Alliance Seal
The AYNLA seal is the emblem used by the organization both domestic and international. The shield symbolizes strength and protection and assurance while the globe symbolizes the global competitiveness of each member in providing health care and it also symbolizes the reach of the services of the Alliance. The lamp symbolizes the nursing profession and the laurel leaves symbolize peace, advocacy, education and nobility. The Baybayin inscriptions, the ancient Filipino way of writing, "Pinuno" which means "Leader" in English.

Partnerships and programs

Adolescent HIV Nursing
AYNLA is currently implementing Adolescent HIV Nursing Model for Community-based Treatment, Care, and Support project in partnership with United Nations Children's Fund (UNICEF) and Department of Health. The project aims to provide adolescents living with HIV (ALHIV) a rigorous, comprehensive HIV treatment, care, and support through integrated medical and social care approaches to achieve better health outcomes. It specifically aims to pilot an HIV Nursing Model that caters to ALHIV needs through community-based approaches in two high burdened sites (Iloilo/Zamboanga), to develop and implement standardized non-discriminatory, youth-friendly, nursing module for treatment, care and support of ALHIV, and to generate evidence through documentation of knowledge product and experiences including lessons learned.

Further, a National Steering Committee was established to provide support in the successful implementation of the project and in meeting its objectives. It will serve as a governing body providing strategic leadership and governance oversight. It is expected to make key policy decisions relative to Adolescent HIV Nursing, guide the implementing partner in the execution of the project, and provide reviews on the results of the project evaluations that will take place periodically. More importantly, the NSC will help in ensuring the sustainability of the project that will provide quality and efficient HIV care, treatment, and support among adolescents. The members of the NSC include Department of Health, Department of Social Welfare and Development, Council for the Welfare of Children, National Youth Commission, and Regional DOH/DSWD Offices.

Kalusugan Pangkalahatan (Universal Health Care)
The organization partnered with the Department of Health (Philippines) (DOH) in conducting series of community town hall assemblies known as "Usapang KP" where the DOH can directly consult the people on their needs and problems concerning healthcare delivery in their community through AYNLA's nurses. Inputs of these assemblies were used for policy development and recommendation to the office of the DOH Secretary for the proper implementation of the Universal Health Care program in the Philippines.

AYNLA also worked with the DOH and Probe Media Foundation for the implementation of a primary health care roving bus called "Lakbay Buhay Kalusugan" touring 10 key areas in the country doing health promotion activities. It also partnered with DOH in the implementation of the national monitoring and evaluation activities for the RNHEALS project.

AYNLA also worked with PhilHealth ensuring the effectiveness of the implementation of its program, PhilHealth Cares. It was invited by the PhilHealth president to be part of the multi-specialty group called PhilHealth Watch that will help monitor PhilHealth's programs.

Lastly, AYNLA also worked with the International Labour Organization on Health and Migration issues.

Philippine Reproductive Health Law
AYNLA is known to be publicly supportive of having a national comprehensive reproductive health law emphasizing the role of nurses as health educators, patient counselors, and consultants. It joined the Technical Panel of Experts which reviewed and finalized the draft of then Reproductive Health (RH) bill. Finally, AYNLA participated in developing the implementing rules and regulation of the said law.

UHC Global Coalition
AYNLA actively participated in advocacy efforts within the Universal Health Coverage (UHC) Coalition, led by Global Health Strategies on behalf of The Rockefeller Foundation, to raise awareness about the need to expand affordable and quality health services. AYNLA most recently demonstrated its commitment through hosting a successful event timed to Universal Health Coverage Day 2015.

Accolades and recognitions 

Ten Accomplished Youth Organization (TAYO) Awards
AYNLA's program  Kalingang Bayan: The National Nursing Mission was selected as one of the National Finalists of the 9th TAYO Awards, organized by TAYO Foundation in partnership with the National Youth Commission. The said project focuses on providing essential health services to communities including health education and consultation, as well as providing training of health workers. Awarding ceremonies were held at the Malacañan Palace, Philippines.

6th United Nations Population Fund Country Programme
AYNLA contributed to the effective implementation of the 6th UNFPA Country Program of Assistance to the Government of the Philippines from 2005-2011, which supported national and local partners to prevent maternal deaths and achieve Millennium Development Goal 5.

Healthy Lifestyle Exemplar Awards
A Plaque of Commendation was awarded to AYNLA by the Health and Lifestyle Magazine, under the category of Health Education and Public Service, for its program focusing on patient education and health promotion.

Care Challenge Awards by Connecting Nurses
The program aim to deliver interactive online shows educating essential health concerns.

References

External links

Nursing group advances youth, healthcare issues - Philstar Last retrieved 29 February 2016.
Oversupply of Nurses forces them to pay to work for free Last retrieved 29 February 2016.
Search for 2015 Healthy Lifestyle Exemplars Last retrieved 29 February 2016.
Health groups urge lawmakers to finally approve RH Bill. Last retrieved 29 February 2016.
No to Bicam Committee’s Cut of DOH Budget for FP! Uphold the RPRH Law, Uphold Women’s Rights!
Labor party, nurse group join hands for RH on Nurses Day – Partido ng Manggagawa. Last retrieved 29 February 2016.
Universal Health Coverage Day Global Partners. Retrieved 4 March 2016.
Speech of President Aquino at the 9th Ten Accomplished Youth Organizations (TAYO) awarding ceremony, October 27, 2011.
Message of President Aquino to the Alliance of Young Nurse Leaders and Advocates International Inc. on the occasion of their 3rd National Convention, September 22, 2012.
| col2 =
Abra Nurses Call for the Passage of RH Bill. Last retrieved 29 February 2016.
Essentials of Nursing Leadership and Management by Patricia Kelly, Janice Tazbir – See page 206.
Disaster Preparedness for Pregnant Women – Millennia2015.
 (Video) AYNLA Consultants Greetings
(Video) Greetings of The Conference of NGOs in Consultative Relationship to AYNLA
Oversupply of Nurses blamed for illegal recruitment. Last retrieved 29 February 2016.
Philippine Senate Resolution No. 806. Retrieved 4 March 2016.
Nursing dream turns sour in the Philippines.  (BBC)  Retrieved 4 March 2016.
Message of President Aquino for Universal Health Coverage Day.
AYNLA: Taking the cudgels for Philippine nurses Retrieved 10 March 2017.
AYNLA refutes the President’s Veto of Proposed Comprehensive Nursing Law Retrieved 10 March 2017.
Young Nurses in Support for the Passage of A Comprehensive Nursing Law Retrieved 10 March 2017.

Nursing organizations in the Philippines
Professional associations based in the Philippines
Organizations based in Metro Manila
Organizations established in 2009
2009 establishments in the Philippines